Suduroba is a village in the municipality of İmamqulukənd in the Qusar Rayon of Azerbaijan.

References

Populated places in Qusar District